Tania Park is an urban park located at 2 Bareena Drive, Balgowlah Heights, a suburb of Sydney, New South Wales, Australia. 

Administered by the Northern Beaches Council, the park functions as a suburban park containing large dog exercise areas, sporting facilities and play equipment. The park is adjacent to Dobroyd Head which offers commanding views of Sydney, Middle and North Harbours. Located on a high point, it contains the 90.3 2MWM transmitter, which can be heard across northern and eastern Sydney.

It is named after Tania Verstak, a winner of the 1962 Miss International Beauty pageant, who was brought up locally.

References

Parks in Sydney
Balgowlah, New South Wales
1964 establishments in Australia
Parks established in 1964